The Senior League World Series Latin America Region is one of six International regions that currently sends teams to the World Series in Easley, South Carolina. The region's participation in the SLWS dates back to 1963.

Prior to 1974, the champions of Mexico and Puerto Rico received a berth into the SLWS. In 1974 the two regions merged to form the original Latin America Region. In 2017 the region was split in two, creating a new region of the same name, and the Caribbean Region.

Latin America Region Countries

Region Champions

Mexico Region Champions

Puerto Rico Region Champions

Latin America Region (1974–2016) Champions

Results by Country

Latin America Region (2017–Present) Champions
As of the 2022 Senior League World Series.

Results by Country
As of the 2022 Senior League World Series.

See also
Latin America Region in other Little League divisions
Little League – Latin America
Little League – Mexico
Little League – Caribbean
Intermediate League
Junior League
Senior League – Caribbean
Big League

References

Senior League World Series
Latin America
Latin American baseball leagues